The Paumier MP2 Baladin is a French-built light sporting aircraft of the 1960s.

Design and construction

The MP2 Baladin was designed and constructed by Maurice Paumier. The two-seat side-by-side design was advanced for its day amongst amateur constructors, as it featured such refinements as a variable-pitch airscrew, landing flaps and a retractable tricycle undercarriage.

The aircraft possessed an exceptionally clean finish, being of wooden construction with plywood- and fabric-covered wings and a plywood-covered fuselage. These features enabled the Baladin to attain a maximum speed of 158 mph on a 90 h.p. engine. A one-piece all-moving tailplane is employed, and a feature of the design is the large wingtip endplate which slides rearward for access to the fuel filler pipe.

Operational history

The prototype MP2 Baladin F-PJKV has had a series of private owners since its first flight in early 1961.  It is currently (early 2009) operational from its base at Beauvais-Tille airport near Paris. A second example F-PPPC was built and initially based at Guyancourt aerodrome near Paris.

Specifications
(per Green, 1965, p. 59)

References
Notes

1960s French civil utility aircraft
Low-wing aircraft
Single-engined tractor aircraft
Aircraft first flown in 1961